Aroldo Casali (18 October 1925 – 10 February 2015) was a Sammarinese sports shooter. He competed in the 50 metre pistol event at the 1960 Summer Olympics.

References

External links
 

1925 births
2015 deaths
Sammarinese male sport shooters
Italian male sport shooters
Italian people of Sammarinese descent
Olympic shooters of San Marino
Shooters at the 1960 Summer Olympics
People from Forlì
Sportspeople from the Province of Forlì-Cesena